Statistics of Austrian national league in the 1971–72 season.

Overview
It was contested by 15 teams, and FC Wacker Innsbruck won the championship.

League standings

Results

References
Austria - List of final tables (RSSSF)

Austrian Football Bundesliga seasons
Aust
1971–72 in Austrian football